The Nuevo Mundo Dam is an embankment dam on the Moa River about  south of Moa in Holguín Province, Cuba. The purpose of the dam is municipal water supply and hydroelectric power generation. The 2 MW power station at the base of the dam was commissioned in 2010.

References

Dams in Cuba
Hydroelectric power stations in Cuba
Dams completed in 1985
Energy infrastructure completed in 2010
Buildings and structures in Holguín Province
1985 establishments in Cuba
21st-century architecture in Cuba
20th-century architecture in Cuba